The African Combined Events Championships is an international athletics competition between African athletes in the disciplines of men's decathlon and women's heptathlon. It became part of the IAAF Combined Events Challenge circuit in 2011.

The two-day event was established in 1999, when it was held in the Algerian capital of Algiers. A second edition was scheduled for 2003, to be held in Réduit, Mauritius, but this plan was abandoned. The second edition of the event was held in Tunis two years later and it was held along with the African Race Walking Championships. Réduit has been the regular host for the competition since 2009, with the last three championships having been held at the town's Maryse Justin Stadium. In 2012, an open track and field meeting, organised by former Mauritian sprinter Stéphan Buckland, was held alongside the main combined events meeting.

Ghana's Margaret Simpson and Ali Kamé of Madagascar are both three time champions of their respective events. Kamé's winning score of 7685 points in 2011 is the event record for the decathlon (as well as being a Malagasy record). Simpson set the current heptathlon record of 6184 points in 2012.

The titles contested at this championships are considered separate from the combined events that feature on the programme at the biennial African Championships in Athletics.

Editions

Medalists
Key:

Decathlon

 † = France's Daouda Amboudi competed as a guest athlete and had the third best performance with a score of 6289 points.
  †† = Italy's Michele Calvi competed as a guest athletes and had the second best performance with a score of 7305 points.

Heptathlon

 † = Nafissatou Thiam of Belgium competed as a guest athlete and had the second best performance with a score of 5906 points.
 †† = Mari Klaup of Estonia competed as a guest athlete and had the second best performance with a score of 5583 points.

References

External links
Athletics Africa website

Continental athletics championships
Athletics combined events
Combined events
Decathlon
Recurring sporting events established in 1999
Combined events competitions
